Benjamin Baier (born 23 July 1988) is a German footballer who plays as an attacking midfielder for Viktoria Aschaffenburg.

Career

Baier began his career with Kickers Offenbach, making his debut in November 2007 as a substitute for Denis Epstein in a 2–1 defeat to SpVgg Greuther Fürth in the 2. Bundesliga. Offenbach were relegated at the end of the 2007–08 season, and Baier spent the following two years playing for the club in the 3. Liga, before joining RB Leipzig of the Regionalliga Nord in 2010. A year later he returned to the 3. Liga, and Hessen, to sign for SV Darmstadt 98. In the 2013–14 season Darmstadt finished in third place, and won promotion to the 2. Bundesliga after a dramatic win over Arminia Bielefeld in the playoff. Baier would leave the club at the end of the season, though, joining Regionalliga West side Rot-Weiss Essen.

On 16 June 2019, Viktoria Aschaffenburg announced that Baier had joined the club on a 2-year contract.

Personal life

Baier's brother Daniel is a professional footballer, as was his father Jürgen.

References

External links

1988 births
Living people
German footballers
SV Darmstadt 98 players
Kickers Offenbach players
RB Leipzig players
Rot-Weiss Essen players
Viktoria Aschaffenburg players
2. Bundesliga players
3. Liga players
Regionalliga players
Association football midfielders
People from Aschaffenburg
Sportspeople from Lower Franconia
Footballers from Bavaria